David Edmonds (born 1964) is a radio feature maker at the BBC World Service. He studied at Oxford University, has a PhD in philosophy from the Open University and has held fellowships at the University of Chicago and the University of Michigan. Edmonds is the author of Caste Wars: A Philosophy of Discrimination and co-author with John Eidinow of Wittgenstein's Poker: The Story of a Ten-Minute Argument Between Two Great Philosophers and Bobby Fischer Goes to War: How the Soviets Lost the Most Extraordinary Chess Match of All Time.

With Nigel Warburton he produces the popular podcast series Philosophy Bites.

He also presents the Philosophy 24/7 podcast series produced by Hugh Fraser of the Storynory podcast, and consults with Michael Chaplin on the BBC radio plays The Ferryhill Philosophers.

He has also written a book on the trolley problem, entitled Would You Kill the Fat Man?. In this he outlines the problem and several of its variations, providing a rounded view on the trolley problem whilst analysing many ethical theories and how they would respond to the trolley problem.

Selected works
Wittgenstein's Poker, Faber & Faber, 2001.  
Bobby Fischer Goes to War: How the Soviets Lost the Most Extraordinary Chess Match of All Time. 2004. HarperCollins Publishers. 
Rousseau's Dog: Two Great Thinkers at War in the Age of Enlightenment. 2006. 
Caste Wars, Routledge, 2006. 
Would You Kill the Fat Man, Princeton University Press, 2013. 
Undercover Robot, My First Year as a Human with Bertie Fraser, Walker Books, 2020. 
The Murder of Professor Schlick: The Rise and Fall of the Vienna Circle, Princeton University Press, 2020.

References

External links
David Higham Associates webpage
Philosophy Bites podcast 
Philosophy 247 podcast

Academics of the Open University
Alumni of the University of Oxford
University of Chicago fellows
University of Michigan fellows
Living people
21st-century British philosophers
21st-century British writers
1964 births